Arasiramani is a panchayat town in Salem district  in the state of Tamil Nadu, India.

Demographics
 India census, Arasiramani had a population of 13,822. Males constitute 53% of the population and females 47%. Arasiramani has an average literacy rate of 44%, lower than the national average of 59.5%; with 66% of the males and 34% of females literate. 10% of the population is under 6 years of age.

References

Cities and towns in Salem district